Justin Augustus Lafferty (born May 13, 1971) is an American politician from the state of Tennessee. A Republican, Lafferty has represented the 89th district of the Tennessee House of Representatives, based in the western suburbs of Knoxville, since 2019. In May, 2021, he attracted widespread media attention for proclaiming (contrary to historical fact) that the three-fifths compromise in the U.S. Constitution was enacted to end slavery.

Career
In 2018, Roger Kane announced his retirement from the 89th district of the Tennessee House of Representatives, and a crowded field formed to replace him. Lafferty, a stay-at-home father and a landlord, was considered a significant underdog against several of his competitors, including former Knox County sheriff Tim Hutchison and former state senator Stacey Campfield. However, Lafferty outpolled both to win the primary with just over 30% of the vote. In the strongly Republican suburban seat, Lafferty went on to soundly win the general election over Democrat Coleen Martinez, 64-36%.

Remarks on Three-Fifths Compromise
On May 4, 2021, Lafferty made an impassioned speech on the Tennessee House floor in defense of the Three-fifths Compromise, a provision of the original U.S. Constitution resulting from a 1787 agreement between northern and southern states, providing that three-fifths of a state's slave population would be counted for representation in the U.S. House of Representatives. The compromise is regarded as one of the most racist deals among the states during the country’s founding. Lafferty said in his speech that the three-fifths compromise was adopted for "the purpose of ending slavery."

Personal life
Lafferty lives in Knoxville with his wife and daughter.

References

Living people
Republican Party members of the Tennessee House of Representatives
21st-century American politicians
1971 births
University of Tennessee alumni
People from Knoxville, Tennessee